Bob Jessop  (born 3 March 1946) is a British academic who has published extensively on state theory and political economy. He is currently Distinguished Professor of Sociology at the University of Lancaster.

Work
Jessop's major contribution to state theory is in treating the state not as an entity but as a social relation with differential strategic effects. This means that the state is not something with an essential, fixed property, such as a neutral coordinator of different social interests, an autonomous corporate actor with its own bureaucratic goals and interests, or the "executive committee of the bourgeoisie", as often described by pluralists, elitists/statists, and conventional Marxists, respectively. Rather, what the state is essentially determined by is the nature of the wider social relations in which it is situated, especially the balance of social forces.

The state can thus be understood as follows: First, the state has varied natures, apparatuses, and boundaries according to its historical and geographical developments as well as its specific conjunctures. One of these apparatuses is state projects, which include a mechanism that Jessop calls structural selectivity. He claims that state structures "offer unequal chances to different forces within and outside that state to act for different political purposes". However, there is a strategic limit to this variation, imposed by the given balance of forces at specific time and space. Thus, second, the state has differential effects on various political and economic strategies in a way that privileges some over others, but at the same time, it is the interaction among these strategies that results in such exercise of state power. This approach is called the "strategic-relational approach" and can be considered as a creative extension and development of Marx's concept of capital not as a thing but as a social relation and of Antonio Gramsci's and Nicos Poulantzas's concept of the state as a social relation, something more than narrow political society.

Jessop uses the term "time sovereignty" (or "temporal sovereignty") to stand for a government's right to have at its disposition the time that is required for considered political decision-making. He states that this "time sovereignty" is endangered as governments see themselves pressured to compress their own decision-making cycles so that they can make more timely and appropriate interventions.

Major works

 The Capitalist State: Marxist Theories and Methods, Oxford: Blackwell 1982.
 Nicos Poulantzas: Marxist Theory and Political Strategy, London: Macmillan 1985.
 Thatcherism: a Tale of Two Nations, Cambridge: Polity (co-authors—Kevin Bonnett, Simon Bromley, Tom Ling) 1988.
 State Theory: Putting the Capitalist State in Its Place, Cambridge: Polity 1990.
 The Future of the Capitalist State, Cambridge: Polity 2002.
 Beyond the Regulation Approach Putting Capitalist Economies in their Place (co-authored with Ngai-Ling Sum) Cheltenham: Edward Elgar 2006. Winner of the Gunnar Myrdal Prize awarded given by the European Association for Evolutionary Political Economy for the best book published in 2006 broadly in line with its aims and objectives.
 State Power: A Strategic-Relational Approach, Cambridge: Polity 2007.
 Towards a Cultural Political Economy. Putting Culture in its Place in Political Economy (co-authored with Ngai-Ling Sum) Cheltenham: Edward Elgar 2014.
 The State. Past, Present, Future, Cambridge: Polity 2016.

References

External links 

 The strategic-relational approach, realism and the state: from regulation theory to neoliberalism via Marx and Poulantzas, an interview with Bob Jessop by Jamie Morgan

1946 births
Living people
Academics of Lancaster University
Fellows of the Academy of Social Sciences
British sociologists
Marxist writers